Lulu Tenney is an American fashion model. She is best known for her work with Calvin Klein. In September 2016 and March 2017, she appeared on the cover of Vogue Italia. She again appeared on the cover in September 2020. She currently ranks as one of the "Top 50" models in the fashion industry.

Career
Tenney was discovered by a modeling agent while walking in Manhattan. She has been on the cover of Vogue Italia twice.

On the runway, she debuted at Calvin Klein in 2017, opening the show. She subsequently opened the shows of the next three seasons. For the brand, she has appeared in many advertisements such as S/S 2018 jeans campaign with Paris Jackson and actress Millie Bobby Brown. The S/S 2017 campaign she appeared in, which was advertised at British retailer House of Fraser was removed by the store due to complaints that she was perceived as much too young to be modeling undergarments, despite the fact that she would have been over 18 at the time as required by law. Tenney has also modeled for Ralph Lauren. On the runway, she has walked for Dior, Alberta Ferretti, Givenchy, Chanel, Chloé, Fendi, Marc Jacobs, Hugo Boss, Valentino, Hermès, Dries van Noten, Prada, Jason Wu, Salvatore Ferragamo, Anna Sui, and Tory Burch among others.

In addition to Vogue Russia, Vogue Me China, and Vogue Ukraine, Tenney has on the cover of Dazed magazine.

Tenney appeared in The xx's music video "I Dare You"

References 

Year of birth missing (living people)
People from New York City
The Lions (agency) models
Ford Models models
American female models
Models from New York City
Living people
21st-century American women
Next Management models